Nabq may refer to:

 Nabq Protected Area, a nature reserve in Egypt
 A subdivision of Sharm El Sheikh, Egypt

See also
 Nabqa day, a Palestinian day of commemoration